Chickentown is an unincorporated community in Northampton County, Pennsylvania. Chickentown is located at the junction of Hanoverville Road and Pennsylvania Route 512. It is part of the Lehigh Valley metropolitan area.

The name Chickentown originated from the several poultry farms previously located in the area, especially those on nearby Jacksonville Road, which was previously called Chickentown Road because of the large number of farms located on it. However, this name fell into obscurity sometime before the turn of the 21st century as the area became more residential.

References 

Unincorporated communities in Northampton County, Pennsylvania
Unincorporated communities in Pennsylvania